Alec Edward Acton (1938–1994) born in Leicester was an English professional footballer who played in the Football League as a defender for Stockport County.

Career statistics
Source:

References

1938 births
1994 deaths
Footballers from Leicester
English footballers
Association football defenders
Stoke City F.C. players
Stockport County F.C. players
English Football League players